Recherche et Industrie Thérapeutiques (R.I.T.) was founded in Genval, Belgium, as a penicillin factory in 1945 by Dr Pieter De Somer, who later became the founder of the Rega Institute for Medical Research and rector of the Katholieke Universiteit Leuven (Leuven, Belgium). The industrialist Jean Lannoye provided the funding for the company. The company started its vaccine research and production in the 1950s. The present CEO of the company is Roger Connor.

In 1968 the company was acquired by Smith, Kline & French and the name was changed in SmithKline-RIT. In 1989 it became SmithKline Beecham Biologicals, and since 2000 GlaxoSmithKline Biologicals.

History
 1945: Creation under the name of R.I.T. in Genval
 1956: Beginning of the activity of production of vaccines (polio vaccine)
 1958: Acquisition of the site in Rixensart
 1968: R.I.T. becomes a subsidiary company of SmithKline Corp.
 1989: Merger between SmithKline and Beecham
 1992: Acquisition of SSW-Dresden (Germany)
 1995: Extension of the site of Rixensart towards two new sites in Belgium:
 Wavre for the production
 Gembloux for the scaling-up
 1995: Agreement on a joint-venture in China
 1997: Agreement on a joint-venture in Russia
 1998: Collaboration agreement with Egypt
 1999: Agreement on a partnership with Brazil
 2000: Merger between GlaxoWellcome and SmithKlineBeecham to form GlaxoSmithKline

See also
 MMR vaccine
 Rega Institute for Medical Research

References

 GlaxoSmithKline Biologicals (history)

External links
 GlaxoSmithKline Biologicals

Pharmaceutical companies of Belgium
GSK plc
Pharmaceutical companies established in 1945
1945 establishments in Belgium
Rixensart
Companies based in Walloon Brabant